Ejen Ali (literally translated as Agent Ali), is a Malaysian animated series produced by WAU Animation, focusing on a boy which accidentally became a MATA agent after using Infinity Retinal Intelligent System (I.R.I.S), a device prototype created by Meta Advance Tactical Agency (M.A.T.A).

Series overview

Episode list

Season 1 (2016–17)

Season 2 (2017–18)

Season 3 (2022–23)
Beginning on 25 June 2022, the third season were exclusively premiered on Disney+ Hotstar in Southeast Asia (while in Singapore and Philippines for Disney+ only).

References

External links
 
 

Lists of Malaysian animated television series episodes